Laurence Jonathan Cohen,  (7 May 1923 – 26 September 2006), was a British philosopher.  He was Fellow and Praelector in Philosophy, 1957–90 and Senior Tutor, 1985–90 at The Queen's College, Oxford and British Academy Reader in Humanities, University of Oxford, 1982–84.

He was educated at St. Paul's School, London and Balliol College, Oxford.

Career
World War II: in Naval Intelligence in UK and SEAC, 1942–45, and Lieut (Sp.) RNVR
 Assistant in Logic and Metaphysics, Edinburgh University, 1947–50
 Lecturer in Philosophy, St. Andrews University, 1950–57
 Commonwealth Fund Fellow in Logic at Princeton and Harvard, 1952–53
 Visiting Lecturer, Hebrew University, Jerusalem, 1952
 Visiting Professor: Columbia University, 1967; Yale University, 1972; Northwestern University, 1988
 Visiting Fellow, Australian National University, 1980.
 Fellow, The Queen's College, Oxford 1957-1990
 Senior Tutor, The Queen's College, Oxford 1985-1990

Work
The principal emphasis in his work was on the powers and use of reasoning and how reasoning should be used properly on professional assessment of evidence in legal and scientific trials.

Initially a political philosopher, he published The Principles of World Citizenship in 1954. He then pursued the question "What do you mean by...?"", in The Diversity of Meaning (1962). This involved linguistic philosophy and sociology.

His best-known book, The Probable and the Provable (1977), argued in favour of inductive reasoning when making up your mind, for instance, when on a jury.  The human ability to bring in all the relevant factors when arguing from known specifics to a general conclusion—the essence of inductive reasoning—was in his view far too complex to express in a logical equation. But their methods of reasoning could still be held up to inspection and, to some extent, classified.

In clinical and scientific work, he was also concerned with the nature of proof.  Another book, Belief and Acceptance (1992), examined the bases of people's assumptions.

Honours
 He was elected a Fellow of the British Academy in 1973
 President, B'nai B'rith Oxford Lodge, 1974
 British Academy Philosophical Lecturer, 1975
 Fry Lecturer, Bristol University, 1976
 Austin Lecturer, UK Association for Legal and Social Philosophy, 1982
 Secretary, International Union of History and Philosophy of Science (Division of Logic, Methodology and Philosophy of Science), 1975–83, Pres., 1987–91
 President, British Society for the Philosophy of Science, 1977–79
 Chairman, British National Committee for Logic, Methodology and Philosophy of Science, 1987–91
 Chairman, Section K (Philosophy), British Academy, 1994–96
 General Editor, Clarendon Library of Logic and Philosophy, 1973–2006

Publications
 The Principles of World Citizenship, 1954
 The Diversity of Meaning, 1962
 The Implications of Induction, 1970
 The Probable and the Provable, 1977
 Applications of Inductive Logic, 1980 (Joint editor)
 Logic, Methodology and Philosophy of Science, 1982 (Joint editor)
 The Dialogue of Reason, 1986
 An Introduction to the Philosophy of Induction and Probability, 1989
 An Essay on Belief and Acceptance, 1992
 Knowledge and Language. Selected Essays of L. Jonathan Cohen, 2002

References
 Who's Who 2005

 Jewish Chronicle, 26 October 2006 (obituary)

External links 
Jonathan Cohen obituary in The Daily Telegraph (archived by Wayback Machine)

1923 births
2006 deaths
Burials in Oxfordshire
Royal Navy officers
Academics of the University of St Andrews
Alumni of Balliol College, Oxford
English Jews
Fellows of the British Academy
Fellows of The Queen's College, Oxford
Columbia University faculty
Harvard University staff
Jewish philosophers
People educated at St Paul's School, London
Royal Naval Volunteer Reserve personnel of World War II
Princeton University fellows
Burials at Wolvercote Cemetery